Tui Dasht (also Romanized as Tū’ī Dasht) is a village in Khara Rud Rural District, in the Central District of Siahkal County, Gilan Province, Iran. At the 2006 census, its population was 20, in 4 families.

References 

Populated places in Siahkal County